Viktor Vasilievich Zhluktov (born January 26, 1954) is a Russian former professional ice hockey player who played for CSKA Moscow and the Soviet Union.

In the 1976 Canada Cup, Zhluktov scored 5 goals and 4 assists in 5 games, tying him for both the most points (with Bobby Orr and Denis Potvin) and goals (with Milan Nový and Bobby Hull) in the tournament, despite playing two fewer games than the players he tied with.

For a while he played in the same line-up as Vladimir Krutov, Sergei Makarov, Viacheslav Fetisov and Alexei Kasatonov before Igor Larionov replaced him.

External links

1954 births
HC CSKA Moscow players
Ice hockey players at the 1976 Winter Olympics
Ice hockey players at the 1980 Winter Olympics
Living people
Medalists at the 1980 Winter Olympics
Medalists at the 1976 Winter Olympics
Minnesota North Stars draft picks
Olympic gold medalists for the Soviet Union
Olympic ice hockey players of the Soviet Union
Olympic medalists in ice hockey
Olympic silver medalists for the Soviet Union
People from Inta
Soviet ice hockey centres
Sportspeople from the Komi Republic